The women's team competition at the 2013 European Judo Championships was held on 28 April at the László Papp Budapest Sports Arena in Budapest, Hungary.

Results

Repechage

References

External links
 

Wteam
EU 2013
European Women's Team Judo Championships
Euro